Mount Kolah Qazi or Kuh-e Kolah Qazi is a mountain that is located about 30 kilometres southeast of the city of Isfahan in Isfahan Province in Iran. With an elevation of 2534 metres, the highest peak is in the north-central part of the mountain. Having a general northwest-southeast direction, this mountain is situated southeast of Mount Shah Kuh and west and almost parallel to Mount Qaruneh. With an average width of about 5 kilometres and a length of almost 20 kilometres, this mountain is a part of the Mount Kolah Qazi Protected Nature Reserve which covers an area of about 50,000 hectares of national park and 3,000 hectares of protected wildlife region.

Etymology
In Persian ‘’kolah’’ means ‘’cap’’ or ‘’headdress’’ and ‘’qazi’’ means ‘’judge’’, so ‘’kolah qazi’’ or ‘’kolah-e qazi’’ means ‘’cap or headdress of a judge’’.  This mountain is called Kolah Qazi because its highest peak looks like the headdress of the judges in old times.

Geology
Mount Kolah Qazi is located in Sanandaj-Sirjan geologic and structural zone of Iran and it is mainly made of Lower Cretaceous limestone. Only a very small part of the central and southern section of the mountain is formed by Upper Jurassic granodiorite.

References

Kolah
Landforms of Isfahan Province
Mountains of Iran